Pennsylvania's 28th congressional district was one of Pennsylvania's districts of the United States House of Representatives.

List of representatives

References

 
 
 Congressional Biographical Directory of the United States 1774–present

28
Former congressional districts of the United States
1889 establishments in Pennsylvania
1963 disestablishments in Pennsylvania
Constituencies established in 1889
Constituencies disestablished in 1963